Muzafer Korkuti (born 1936) is an Albanian archaeologist and prehistorian. He is considered an expert on the prehistoric period of Albania. Korkuti was the director of the Institute of Archeology at the Centre for Albanological Studies in Tirana from 1998 to 2005 and currently serves as President of the Academy of Sciences of Albania. He is also a corresponding member of the German Archaeological Institute.

Life 
Born in Fterrë, Sarandë District, southern Albania, Korkuti studied history at the University of Tirana in 1957-62 and specialized on archaeology in China. In 1966 he took part in the excavations of Maliq in Korçë County. From 1991 to 1996 he co-headed with Karl Petruso of the University of Texas a collaborative project in Konispol.

Sources 

People from Himara
1936 births
20th-century Albanian historians
Albanian archaeologists
21st-century Albanian historians
Living people
Members of the Academy of Sciences of Albania
Illyrologists